Kim Cascone (December 21, 1955) is an  Italian American composer of electronic music who is known for his releases in the ambient, drone, industrial and electro-acoustic genre on his own record label, Silent Records.

Biography 
In 1989 Cascone became an assistant music editor for director David Lynch on Twin Peaks and Wild At Heart. Musically he has used various aliases over the years but became best known under the moniker Heavenly Music Corporation, a name taken from a track on the record (No Pussyfooting) by Brian Eno and Robert Fripp. Cascone released four full albums under this name from 1993 to 1996.

In 1996 Cascone sold Silent Records and Pulsoniq Distribution to work as a sound designer/composer for Thomas Dolby's company Beatnik. After leaving the company in 1998, Cascone went on to serve as the Director of Content for Staccato Systems, a spin-off company from CCRMA, Stanford University where he co-invented an algorithm for realistic audio atmospheres and backgrounds for video games called Event Modeling. He returned to making music in 1999 and has since been releasing records using his own name
on various labels as well as his own label, anechoic (named after his last Heavenly Music Corporation release), which he established in 1996. Cascone has released more than 50 albums of electronic music since 1984 and has recorded or performed with Merzbow, Keith Rowe, Tony Conrad, Scanner, John Tilbury, Domenico Sciajno and Pauline Oliveros, among others.

In academic writing, Cascone is known for his paper The Aesthetics of Failure, which outlined the use of digital glitches and systemic failure in the creation of post-digital and laptop music. He is also on the advisory board of the academic sound journal Interference based in Dublin, Ireland. 

Cascone holds dual Italian and American citizenship as of September 2008.

In 2016 Cascone rebooted his record label Silent Records.

From 2016 to December 30, 2017, Cascone served as the music director for The Silent Channel on SomaFM, an online streaming radio station that features the Silent Records catalog.

Discography
 Blue Cube (Raster-Noton 1998)
 Cathode Flower (Ritornell 1999)
 (Delete) (Fällt 2000)
 Residualism (Ritornell 2001)
 Dust Theories (c74 2001)
 The Crystalline Address, with Scanner (Sub Rosa 2002)
 Pulsar Studies (anechoic 2004)
 Rondo/7Phases/Blowback, with Merzbow (Sub Rosa 2004)
 Gravity Handler (CRC 2004)
 Statistically Improbable Phrases (anechoic 2006)
 The Astrum Argentum (anechoic	2008)
 Pharmacie: Green & Red (anechoic 2008)
 Music for Dagger & Guitar (Aural Terrains 2008)
 anti-musical celestial forces (Storung 2009)
 The Knotted Constellation (fourteen rotted coordinates) (Monotype 2011)
 Subflowers - Phi (Emitter Micro 2016)

As Khem One
 Threshold of Eastern Octaves (Silent Records 2022)
 Lunadronus - The Realm of Lunar Gauzes (Silent Records 2020)
 Heliodronus - Messenger of the Sun (Silent Records 2019)
 Copperopolis - Guitar Study (Humanhood Recordings 2018)
 Modal Gauzes No. 1 - Guitar Study (Daathstaar 2018)
 Pollen & Fragments (Daathstaar 2018)

As PGR
 Silence (PGR, 1985)
 The Flickering of Sowing Time (RRRecords, 1986)
 Cyclone Inhabited by Immobility (Permis de Construire, 1987)
 The Black Field (Silent, 1989)
 Fetish, with Arcane Device (Silent, 1990)
 The Chemical Bride (Silent, 1992)
 The Morning Book of Serpents (Silent, 1995)
 A Hole of Unknown Depth (Silent, 1996)

As Heavenly Music Corporation
 In a Garden of Eden (Silent, 1993 / Astral Industries, 2018)
 Consciousness III (Silent, 1994)
 Lunar Phase (Silent, 1995 / Astral Industries, 2017)
 Anechoic (Silent, 1996)

with KGB Trio
 Swiss Pharmaceuticals (Utech, 2005)
 Smoke on Devil's Mountain (Scrapple Records, 2008)
 Noise Forest (Aural Terrains, 2009)

with Spice Barons
 Future Perfect State (Silent, 1995)

Bibliography 
 Cascone, Kim. "Aesthetics of Failure." Cambridge: MIT Press, 2000.
 Cascone, Kim. "Laptop music-counterfeiting aura in the age of infinite reproduction" Parachute 107, 2002.
 Cascone, Kim. "Grain, Sequence, System: Three Levels of Reception in the Performance of Laptop Music. Contemporary Music Review Volume 22, Issue 4, 2003.
 Cascone, Kim "Evolving the Emergent Content Workshop. Interace Cultures - Artistic Aspects of Interaction - Christa Sommerer, Laurent Mignonneau, Dorothee King (eds.), 2008.
 Cascone, Kim. "Grain of the Auditory Field" Junk Jet No.1, 2007.
 Cascone, Kim. "The Use of Density Groups in Electroacoustic Music" Contemporary Music Review, Volume 30, Issue 2, 2011.
 Cascone, Kim. "Residualism" Sound - Caleb Kelly MIT Press, 2011.
 Cascone, Kim. "Subtle Listening – How Artists Can Develop New Perceptual Circuits" Infinite Grain, March 30, 2014.
 Cascone, Kim. "Transcendigital Imagination: Developing Organs of Subtle Perception" Interference Journal of Sound, Volume 4, 2014.

References

External links
 Kim Cascone Interview on Spiderbytes.com
 Interview with Kim Cascone on Ctheory.net
 Interview with Kim Cascone on Cycling74.com
 Review of CD "Music for Dagger & Guitar" - Joanna Demers
 Dialogue 05: Kim Cascone
 Interview with Kim Cascone for SEAMUS
 Kim Cascone 13 Questions on Prepared Guitar
 Kim Cascone: Dark Stations and Black Fields
 Interview with Kim Cascone for Postdigital Science and Education

Living people
American male composers
21st-century American composers
American electronic musicians
Ambient musicians
People from Albion, Michigan
1955 births
21st-century American male musicians
Thessalonians (band) members